Achalinus formosanus, common name Formosan odd-scaled snake or Taiwan burrowing snake, is a non-venomous snake in family Xenodermidae that is found in Taiwan and in the southern Ryukyu Islands (Japan).

Taxonomy
There are two subspecies:
 Achalinus formosanus formosanus Boulenger, 1908 — Taiwan
 Achalinus formosanus chigirai Ota and Toyama, 1989 — Ryukyu Islands

Specific name formosanus means "from Formosa", referring to the fact that this species was first described from a specimen from Taiwan. chigirai refers to Yoshinori Chigira, who collected the first specimen of Achalinus formosanus chigirai.

Achalinus formosanus formosanus is ecologically and morphologically similar to the Taiwan endemic Achalinus niger; the two differ in some scale counts and characteristics. A study using genetic markers found these two taxa to be overlapping, warranting further studies on their taxonomy.

Distribution
Achalinus formosanus formosanus is known from central and southern Taiwan at elevations of  asl. Achalinus formosanus chigirai occurs at low altitudes (below ) on the Iriomote-jima and Ishigaki Islands, both belonging to the Yaeyama Group.

Description

The whole body is iridescent under light. Head is small, oval, and without distinct neck. Body is slender and tail is moderately short. Eyes are small, bead-like; iris is black and indistinct. Upper head, body and tail is uniform olive, grayish tan, or black. Mid-dorsal row of scales on body and tail show a dark longitudinal line. Ventral surface is olive-yellow or dark gray. The young are usually black.

Behaviour
It is a nocturnal, terrestrial snake that probably preys on earthworms, slugs, and frogs. It is non-venomous and not aggressive. It is oviparous.

Habitat and conservation
Achalinus formosanus formosanus are found in montane humid forests, where they live in dark, wet micro-habitats such as the forest floor, rotten wood, and leaf litter. Achalinus formosanus chigirai have been collected in on a road at night and in a limestone cave in the daytime as well as in low grass along a path in the evening and on forest floor at night.

No significant threats are known. It is not a protected species in Taiwan, but Achalinus formosanus chigirai is classified as "near threatened" in Japan.

References

Xenodermidae
Snakes of Asia
Reptiles of Japan
Reptiles of Taiwan
Reptiles described in 1908
Taxa named by George Albert Boulenger